Slacho Pavlov (born 17 May 1968) is a former Bulgarian professional footballer and manager.

Career

Pavlov spent the majority of his professional career in Bulgarian football, while additionally having two spells abroad - in Turkey and Malta. With Velbazhd Kyustendil, he earned a bronze medal in the A PFG following the conclusion of the 2000/2001 season and also participated in the 2001 Bulgarian Cup Final, which his team lost by a score of 0:1. In total, Pavlov appeared in 306 matches in the top division of Bulgaria, scoring 29 goals. His son Tomislav Pavlov is also a footballer.

References

1968 births
Living people
Bulgarian footballers
Association football midfielders
PFC Minyor Pernik players
PFC Slavia Sofia players
FC Lokomotiv 1929 Sofia players
PFC Velbazhd Kyustendil players
PFC Lokomotiv Plovdiv players
First Professional Football League (Bulgaria) players
Bulgarian expatriate footballers
Bulgarian expatriate sportspeople in Turkey
Expatriate footballers in Turkey
Kayserispor footballers
Expatriate footballers in Malta
Sportspeople from Pernik